The Chanson de toile (also called chanson d'histoire) was a genre of narrative Old French lyric poetry devised by the trouvères which flourished in the late twelfth and early thirteenth century. Some fifteen of them remain; five were written by Audefroi le Bastart, the others are anonymous. Typically, they are set to music (though only four chansons remain with musical annotation) and tell the story of a young, often married woman pining for a lover, with a happy ending. The genre's name derives from toile; that is, they are supposed to have been sung by women who were weaving, and the female main characters also sew as they relate their stories.

The Harvard Dictionary of Music says around 20 remain, but it includes several which were incorporated in larger works such as Jean Renart's Guillaume de Dole (which incorporates no fewer than six chansons de toile); it also suggests that since the woman's voice in the chanson de toile is so prominent some of them may have been composed by women. Musically some of them are quite ornate, considering the relatively simple narrative.

In most cases, the song begins with a brief and sympathetic history of a woman: she is either absent from her lover or married unhappily to an older nobleman and in love with a knight. All but one end happily—the one exception is Bele Doette, who learns that her lover has died and then founds a monastery into which she retreats. The women sometimes appear careless, but their charm and demeanor are attractive. The chansons de toile are considered some of the most beautiful poems produced in Old French, and their importance was such that some of them were included in romances, in which they were sung by the heroines.

See also
 Weaving (mythology)

References

Medieval French literature
Western medieval lyric forms
Old French texts
12th-century poems
13th-century poems